The Henry W. Prince Building, also known as Prince Store, is a historic commercial building located at Southold in Suffolk County, New York. It was built in 1874 and is a two-story, six-bay brick building with a front gabled roof. The building is currently owned by the Southold Historical Society and its affiliated gift shop. It was added to the National Register of Historic Places in 2005.

References

External links
Southold Historical Society

Commercial buildings on the National Register of Historic Places in New York (state)
Commercial buildings completed in 1874
Buildings and structures in Suffolk County, New York
National Register of Historic Places in Suffolk County, New York
1874 establishments in New York (state)